Mansi Junction railway station (station code:- MNE) is a railway station in the Sonpur railway division of East Central Railway. Mansi Station is located in Khagaria district in the Indian state of Bihar. More than 80 trains pass through this station.

References

Railway stations in Khagaria district
Railway junction stations in Bihar
Sonpur railway division